Cairns West State School is located on Hoare Street, Manunda, Queensland, Australia. The school caters for students from Prep to Year 6.

Cairns West was one of the first Queensland schools to offer a "Prep" year.

An Early Intervention class and a Deaf Unit are attached to the School and these facilities provide students with access to specialist teachers.

The suburbs around Cairns West State School contain more "Public Housing" than any other suburbs in Queensland.

Cairns West State School has more Torres Strait Islander and Aboriginal students than any other mainland Queensland school. (other than Djarragun College Gordonvale)

Students represent the school in music festivals and other cultural events throughout North Queensland.

See also
List of schools in Far North Queensland

Public primary schools in Queensland
Schools in Cairns